Barrow Street Theatre is the name of both a 199-seat Off-Broadway theatre located in New York City's historic Greenwich House at 27 Barrow Street and a production company of the same name. From 2003 to 2018, the venue was leased to Barrow Street Theatre, a commercial theater company operated by producers Scott Morfee and Tom Wirtshafter.  The theater space has been operated by Ars Nova since September 1, 2018 under the names Ars Nova at Greenwich House and the Greenwich Street Theatre. The theater space, which opened in 1917, has also been home to SoHo Rep.

While under the jurisdiction of the theatre company, the theater was home to a number of Off-Broadway hits, including Bug by Tracy Letts, Buyer and Cellar, Sweeney Todd and Orson's Shadow by Austin Pendleton.

Following their departure from the Greenwich House theatre, Barrow rebranded as Barrow Street Productions and produced a number of Off Broadway shows including Nassim Soleimanpour's NASSIM at New York City Center.

References

External links 
 
 
 

Theatres in Manhattan
Greenwich Village
Off-Broadway theaters